All Saints' Cathedral, Cairo was consecrated in 1988 and is the home of the Episcopal/Anglican Diocese of Egypt with North Africa and the Horn of Africa. The cathedral is located close to the Marriott Hotel in Zamalek, a residential area of the city that sits on an island in the middle of the River Nile. The building and land were donated by the Egyptian government.

The cathedral compound also houses the Diocesan and Bishop's offices and projects and services – including the Diocese NGO EpiscoCare and Refuge Egypt, which serves Cairo's refugee communities. The church hosts a variety of congregations – with Arabic, English and Sudanese being the largest, although other communities also use the premises for worship.

The church is constructed in concrete and was designed in the shape of a cross at ground level and a crown at the top. Its roof is visible around Zamalek and was described by the Cairo Observer as reminiscent of a lotus flower. It was designed by Egyptian architects Dr. Awad Kamel and Selim Kamel, who also created the design for Cairo's Saint Mark's Coptic Orthodox Cathedral (Cathedral of Abbasiya).

The first  All Saints' in Cairo was completed in 1878. The second opened in 1938 and was sited overlooking the Nile and behind the Egyptian Museum. Designed by Adrian Gilbert Scott (grandson of Sir George Gilbert Scott), it was demolished 40 years later to make way for the 6th October Bridge.

See also

Christianity in Egypt

References

External sources
Diocese of Egypt
Cathedral of Cairo blogspot
Pictures of All Saints' Cathedral

Cathedrals in Cairo
Anglican church buildings in the Middle East
Gezira Island
Anglicanism in Egypt
Adrian Gilbert Scott buildings